Mili Airport is a public use airstrip in the village of Mili on Mili Atoll, Marshall Islands. This airstrip is assigned the location identifier 1Q9 by the FAA and MIJ by the IATA.

Facilities 
Mili Airport is at an elevation of 4 feet (1.2 m) above mean sea level. The runway is designated 05/23 with a turf surface measuring 2,850 by 75 feet (869 x 23 m). There are no aircraft based at Mili.

Airlines and destinations

References

External links 
AirNav airport information for 1Q9

Airports in the Marshall Islands